Sergio Javier Arias Delgado (born 27 February 1988) is a Mexican retired footballer as goalkeeper.

Club career
Arias has played in Chivas' youth division teams and began playing for the Tapatío squad in the 2006 Season. He has yet to make his debut in the Primera División with Chivas. Shortly after the 2005 FIFA U-17 World Championship Hércules CF, at that time a second division club from Spain, was interested in signing him, which would have made him the second player that never had an official debut in the Mexico first division to be signed by a European club, alongside Carlos Vela from Chivas. In 2007, he was loaned to Dorados de Sinaloa and quickly established himself as the club's top keeper, appearing in 36 league matches.

On 9 March 2011, Arias was loaned by Chivas de Guadalajara to American side Chivas USA. After one season in Major League Soccer he returned to Mexico for 2012 with second division side Irapuato FC, on loan from Chivas.

International
Arias was the starting goalkeeper of the Mexico national team that won the 2005 FIFA U-17 World Championship against Brazil. He had a good tournament, playing well and only allowing 3 goals in 9 matches. He was praised by the Mexican press as the "new" Oswaldo Sanchez.

Arias was cut from the final list for the 2007 FIFA U-20 World Cup,  being the only player from the starting eleven that won the U-17 World Championship that did not come back for the U-20 Championship. Even though he did not make the 23 man list for the U-20 World Cup held in Canada in 2007, he was called up to play for the Mexico national team at the 2007 Panamerican Games being held in Rio de Jainero. He was a starter in all the group stage games and was proven victorious by eventually earning the bronze medal in the competition.

Honours
Mexico U17
FIFA U-17 World Championship: 2005

References

External links
 
 

1988 births
Living people
Footballers from Sinaloa
Sportspeople from Los Mochis
Association football goalkeepers
Mexico youth international footballers
C.D. Guadalajara footballers
Dorados de Sinaloa footballers
Chivas USA players
Irapuato F.C. footballers
Alebrijes de Oaxaca players
Coras de Nayarit F.C. footballers
C.F. Mérida footballers
Lobos BUAP footballers
Cimarrones de Sonora players
Mexican footballers